The Idiciu is a left tributary of the river Cund in Romania. It flows into the Cund in Bahnea.

References

Rivers of Romania
Rivers of Mureș County